The Dean Cemetery is a historically important Victorian cemetery north of the Dean Village, west of Edinburgh city centre, in Scotland. It lies between Queensferry Road and the Water of Leith, bounded on its east side by Dean Path and on its west by the Dean Gallery. A 20th-century extension lies detached from the main cemetery to the north of Ravelston Terrace. The main cemetery is accessible through the main gate on its east side, through a "grace and favour" access door from the grounds of Dean Gallery and from Ravelston Terrace. The modern extension is only accessible at the junction of Dean Path and Queensferry Road.

The cemetery
Dean Cemetery, originally known as Edinburgh Western Cemetery, was laid out by David Cousin (an Edinburgh architect who also laid out Warriston Cemetery) in 1846 and was a fashionable burial ground for mainly the middle and upper-classes. The many monuments bear witness to Scottish achievement in peace and war, at home and abroad and are a rich source of Edinburgh and Victorian history.

As the cemetery plots were quickly bought up the cemetery was extended on its north side in 1871. A second set of entrance gates were built on Dean Path, matching the original entrance. Although this section was originally only accessed through this gate the extension was quickly linked to the original section by creating gaps in the mutual wall where no graves existed.

The separated section north of Ravelston Terrace (previously Edgehill Nursery) was purchased in 1877 in anticipation of a sales rate matching that of the original cemetery, but this was not to be, and the area only began to be used in 1909 (excepting John Ritchie Findlay (1898) alone for a decade). This section is relatively plain and generally unremarkable, but does include a line of Scottish Law Lords against the north wall, perhaps trying to echo the "Lord's Row" against the west wall of the original cemetery. Whilst numerically greater in its number of lords it is far less eye-catching.

The entire cemetery is privately owned by the Dean Cemetery Trust Limited, making it one of the few cemeteries still run as it was intended to be run. The resultant layout, with its mature designed landscape, can be seen as an excellent example of a cemetery actually being visible in the form it was conceived to be seen.

The southern access from Belford Road is now blocked and the entrance road here is now grassed and used for the interment of ashes.

The cemetery contains sculpture by Sir John Steell, William Brodie, John Hutchison, Francis John Williamson, Pilkington Jackson, Amelia Robertson Hill, William Birnie Rhind, John Rhind, John Stevenson Rhind, William Grant Stevenson, Henry Snell Gamley, Charles McBride, George Frampton, Walter Hubert Paton and Stewart McGlashan.

Dean House

The cemetery stands on the site of Dean House (built 1614), part of Dean Estate which had been purchased in 1609 by Sir William Nisbet, who became in 1616 Lord Provost of Edinburgh. The Nisbets of Dean held the office of Hereditary Poulterer to the King. The famous herald, Alexander Nisbet, of Nisbet House, near Duns, Scottish Borders, Berwickshire, is said to have written his Systems of Heraldry in Dean House. The estate house was demolished in 1845, and sculptured stones from it are incorporated into the south retaining wall supporting at the south side of the cemetery. This lower, hidden section also contains graves.

John Swinton, Lord Swinton died in the house in 1799. Sir John Stuart Hepburn Forbes was born in Dean House in 1804.

Notable interments

Original cemetery
"N" denotes location in the first northern extension. "LR" denotes location in the Lords Row.

 John Abercromby, 5th Baron Abercromby (1841–1924)
 James Adam, Lord Adam (1824–1914) Senator of the College of Justice (N)
 Sir James Ormiston Affleck FRSE LLD (1840–1922) physician and author (N)
 Sir Stair Agnew (1831–1916)
 Rev David Aitken FRSE (1796–1875) church historian
 John Aitken (1793–1833) Scottish journalist and editor (LR)
 Robert Alexander RSA (1840–1923) artist
 Sir Archibald Alison (d. 1867), advocate and historian, plus his son, Sir Archibald Alison (LR)
 Robert Allan FRSE (1806–1863), mineralogist
 Sir Robert George Allan FRSE (1879–1972) agriculturalist
 Major General William Allan (1832–1918) a general in the Crimean War
 Sir William Allan RSA (1782–1850) artist
 John Anderson (zoologist) (1833–1900) sculpted by David Watson Stevenson
 Thomas Anderson FLS (1832–1870) botanist 
 Thomas Annandale (1838–1907) medical pioneer and surgeon (N)
 Neil Arnott FRS (1788–1874) physician
 Lena Ashwell, Lady Simson (1869–1957) English actress
 Prof William Edmondstoune Aytoun (1813–1865) poet
 Henry Bellyse Baildon (1849–1907) poet and author
 Dr John William Ballantyne FRSE (1861–1923) founder of the science of antenatal pathology
 William Francis Beattie MC (1886–1918) sculptor
 William Hamilton Beattie (1842–1898) architect (including Jenner's and the Balmoral Hotel)
 Dr John Beddoe (1826–1911) ethnologist
 Dr James Warburton Begbie (1826–1876) physician (N)
 Archibald Bell (1776–1854), author and advocate
 Joseph Bell (1837–1911), lecturer at the medical school of the University of Edinburgh, personal surgeon of Queen Victoria
 John Bellany (1942–2013) artist
 Dr John Hughes Bennett (1812–1875) physiologist
 Isabella Bird married name Bishop (1831–1904), traveller, writer and photographer. First female Fellow of the Royal Geographical Society
 Alexander Black (1797–1858), architect
 Alexander William Black MP (1859–1906)
 Very Rev James Black DD (d. 1948) Moderator of the General Assembly of the Church of Scotland in 1938 and Chaplain to the King
 Robert Blackburn, Lord Blackburn LLD (1864–1944) Senator of the Court of Justice (N)
 John Stuart Blackie (1809–1895)
 John Blackwood (1818–1879) creator and editor of Blackwood's Magazine
 Rev Dr Robert Blair (1837–1907) (N)
 Thomas Bonnar (father (d. 1873) and son (d. 1896), a back-to-back monument by David Watson Stevenson) artists, decorators and designers
 Cunninghame Borthwick, 19th Lord Borthwick (1813–1885)
 Sir Thomas Bouch (1822–1880), railway engineer, designer of the original Tay Rail Bridge
 Samuel Bough RSA, artist, (1822–1878) (monument by William Brodie 1879)
 Admiral James Paterson Bower (1806–1889) and his son Major General Hamilton St Clair Bower (1858–1940) (N)
 Prof Francis Darby Boyd (1866–1922) Professor of Clinical Medicine at Edinburgh University
 Mary Syme Boyd (1910–1997) sculptor
 Sir Thomas Jamieson Boyd (1818–1902), Lord Provost of Edinburgh 1877–82 (N)
 Sir Byrom Bramwell (1847–1921), brain surgeon
 Edwin Bramwell FRSE (1873–1952), brain surgeon (N)
 Sir John Clerk Brodie (1811–1888) monument by John Hutchison (including his son Thomas Dawson Brodie) (LR)
 William Brodie (sculptor) (1815–1881)
 Agnes Henderson Brown (1866–1943) suffragette
 Andrew Betts Brown (1841–1906) engineer and inventor, co-founder of Brown Brothers & Co (N)
 James Buchanan (1785–1857) and Jane Buchanan, philanthropists
 John Young Buchanan FRS FRSE (1844–1925) oceanographer
 Thomas Stuart Burnett (1853–1888) sculptor
 Dr John Graham MacDonald Burt FRSE (1809–1868) President of the Royal College of Physicians of Edinburgh
 Samuel Butcher (1850–1910), professor of Greek at Edinburgh University, President of the British Academy, Liberal Unionist MP for Cambridge University (N)
 Florence St John Cadell (1877–1966) artist (N)
 Francis Cadell (artist) (1883–1937) Scottish colourist, his actress sister Jean Cadell (1884–1967) and great nephew, comedy actor Simon Cadell (1950–1996) star of Enemy at the Door and Hi-de-Hi
 Prof Francis Mitchell Caird (1853–1926) President of the Royal College of Surgeons of Edinburgh 1912–14 (N)
 Edward and James Key Caird Dundee jute barons and philanthropists
 Major Donald Fraser Callander (1918–1992), soldier
 General Sir John Campbell (1802–1878) of the East India Company
 Richard Vary Campbell (1840–1901) legal author (N)
 James Carswell (1832–1897) civil engineer, designer of Queen Street Station, Glasgow and the approaches to the Forth Rail Bridge (N)
 James Cassie RSA (1819–1879) artist (N)
 Sir David Patrick Chalmers (1835–1899)
 George Paul Chalmers (1838–1878) artist
 Robert Chambers (1832–1888) publisher of dictionaries and encyclopedia
 Prof John Chiene (1843–1923), surgeon
 Henry Martyn Clark (1887–1916) missionary
 Henry Cockburn, Lord Cockburn (1779–1854)
 John Campbell Colquhoun (1803–1870) writer
 George Somervil Carfrae (1854–1934) civil engineer (N)
 Dr John G. S. Coghill (1834–1899) physician and medical author
 George Combe (1788–1858), lawyer and phrenologist
 Charles Alfred Cooper FRSE (1829–1916) editor of The Scotsman newspaper
 Sir Joseph Montagu Cotterill (1851–1933) surgeon and cricketer, son of Henry Cotterill
 Rev George Coventry FRSE (1791–1872) (LR)
 John Cowan, Lord Cowan (1798–1878) Senator of the College of Justice (LR)
 Robert Cox WS (1810–1872) medallion head by William Brodie
 Robert Cox MP (1845–1899)
 Sir James Coxe (1811–1878) psychiatrist, Commissioner in Lunacy for Scotland
 Dr Kenneth Craik (1914–1945)
 Francis Chalmers Crawford FRSE (1851–1908), botanist
 Rev Prof Thomas Jackson Crawford FRSE (1812–1875), theologian and author
 Robert Croall (1831–1898) coach- and post-master
 Prof John Halliday Croom (1847–1923) physician
 William James Cullen, Lord Cullen (1859–1931)
 Prof Daniel John Cunningham (1850–1909) with his son General Sir Alan Cunningham (1887–1983)
 Robert James Blair Cunynghame FRSE (1841–1903) forensic scientist and physiologist
 Allen Dalzell FRSE (1821–1869), pharmacologist
 Dr Robert Daun FRSE FRCP (1785–1871) military surgeon (LR)
 Marcus Dods DD (1834–1909) theologian
 Dr Andrew Halliday Douglas (1819–1908) President of the Royal College of Physicians of Edinburgh and his namesake son Rev Prof A H Douglas (d. 1902) author and Professor of Apologetic at Know College, Toronto
 Francis Brown Douglas FRSE DL (1814–1885) Lord Provost of Edinburgh 1859–62
 Sir William Fettes Douglas (1822–1891) PRSA artist
 Bishop John Dowden (1840–1910) Bishop of Edinburgh
 Thomas Drybrough (1820–1894) brewer
 Finlay Dun (1795–1853) musician and composer
 John Duncan (surgeon) FRSE (1839–1899) President of the Royal College of Surgeons of Edinburgh 1889–91
 Henry Dunlop of Craigton (1799–1867) Lord Provost of Glasgow 1837 to 1840
 James Dunsmure FRSE (1814–1886) President of the Royal College of Surgeons of Edinburgh
 William Ronald Dodds Fairbairn FRSE (1889–1964) psychiatrist
 Dr James Duncan (1810–1866) and his son Dr John Duncan (1839–1899)
 James Faed (1821–1911) artist
 Rev Valentine Faithfull (1820–1894), clergyman and cricketer
 Sir James Falshaw (1810–1889) Lord Provost (N)
 Vice Admiral Charles Fellowes (1823–1880) (N)
 James Haig Ferguson FRSE (1863–1934) President of both the Royal College of Physicians of Edinburgh and the Royal College of Surgeons of Edinburgh (N)
 Richard Findlay (1943–2017) broadcaster and media magnate
 Rev Robert Howie Fisher DD (1861–1934) minister and author, Chaplain to the King
 David Fleming, Lord Fleming (1877–1944) military hero and law lord
 James Simpson Fleming FRSE (1828–1899)
 Prof John Fleming (naturalist) (1785–1857)
 Prof Edward Forbes (1815–1854) naturalist
 Prof James David Forbes (1809–1868) inventor of the seismometer
 Sir Patrick Johnston Ford Baronet, MP (1880–1945)
 Major-General James George Roche Forlong (1824–1904), soldier and engineer
 Sir John Forrest, Baronet (1817–1883) with Sir William Forrest (1823–1894) and Sir James Forrest (1853–1899)
 William Hope Fowler CVO, MB, ChB, FRCSE, MRCPE, FRSE (1876–1933) x-ray pioneer, victim of his own experiments (N)
 Sir Andrew Henderson Leith Fraser (1848–1919)
 Dr John Fraser FRSE (1844–1925) Commissioner of Lunacy in Scotland 1895–1910
 Patrick Fraser, Lord Fraser (1817–1889) jurist
 Patrick Neill Fraser, FRSE (d. 1905), botanist (plus a cenotaph to his daughter Margaret Neill Fraser, buried in Serbia during the First World War)
 Thomas Richard Fraser (1841–1920), pathologist (N)
 Sir William Fraser (historian) (1816–1898)
 Henry Snell Gamley (1865–1928) artist
 George Alexander Gibson (1854–1913), doctor and amateur geologist, Fellow of the Royal Society of Edinburgh, Chief Physician at Edinburgh Royal Infirmary (N)
 Sir James Gibson, 1st Baronet, (1849–1912) Lord Provost of Edinburgh 1906–1909, MP for Edinburgh 1909–1912
 James Young Gibson (1826–1886) author/translator (bronze by Francis John Williamson) plus his wife Margaret Dunlop Smith (1843–1920) also an author
 John Goodsir (1814–1867) anatomist
 Robert Anstruther Goodsir (1823–1899) doctor and Arctic explorer
 Edward Gordon, Baron Gordon of Drumearn (1814–1879)
 Sir Alexander Grant, 10th Baronet (1826–1884) educationalist and Principal of Edinburgh University
 John Peter Grant (MP) (1774–1848)
 Sir Ludovic Grant 11th Baronet of Dalvey (1862–1836)
 Robert Kaye Greville (1794–1866) botanist
 Charles John Guthrie, Lord Guthrie (1849–1920), Senator of the College of Justice
 William Guy FRSE (1860–1950), pioneer of modern dentistry
 Daniel Rutherford Haldane FRSE PRCPE (1824–1887)
 James Haliburton (1788–1862) Egyptologist
 James Hamilton, 9th Baron Belhaven and Stenton (1822–1893) monument including a bronze by Pilkington Jackson
 Robert Handyside, Lord Handyside (1798–1858)
 Joseph James Hargrave (1841–1894) of the Hudsons Bay Company
 John Harrison FRSE CBE LLD (1847–1922) master tailor and author, son of Sir George Harrison MP
 Lewis John Erroll Hay. 9th Baronet of Park (1866–1923) (N)
 Andrew Fergus Hewat FRSE (1884–1957)
 David Octavius Hill (1802–1870), artist and photography pioneer, Hill & Adamson. The monument is by his second wife, Amelia Robertson Hill (née Paton) (1820–1904) who is buried with him
 Sir James Hodsdon (1858–1928), surgeon, President of the Royal College of Surgeons of Edinburgh 1914–1917
 Franklin Hudson (1864–1918) American-born osteopath (N)
 Robert Gemmell Hutchison (1855–1936) artist (pair of sculpted heads by John Stevenson Rhind)
 Sir Thomas Hutchison (1866–1925) Lord Provost of Edinburgh 1921–1923
 Elsie Inglis (1864–1917) pioneer female doctor and war hero (N)
 Alexander Taylor Innes FRSE LLD (1833–1912) lawyer and historian
 John Irving (1822–1848 or 49), lieutenant aboard , part of the Franklin Expedition searching for the Northwest Passage; his body was found on King William Island (in modern-day Nunavut, Canada) 30 years later and re-interred at Dean Cemetery, 7 November 1881 (monument is carved by Stewart McGlashan)
 Sir William Allan Jamieson (1839–1916) surgeon and medical author, President of the Royal College of Physicians of Edinburgh 1908–1910
 Francis, Lord Jeffrey (1773–1850) (LR)
 Charles Jenner FRSE (1810–1893) founder of Jenners Department Store on Princes Street
 Henry Johnston, Lord Johnston (1844–1931) Senator of the College of Justice (N)
 Sir William Campbell Johnston FRSE LLD (1860–1938) advocate and cricketer (N)
 Artur Jurand (1914–2000) Polish born geneticist (N)
 Frederick Charles Kennedy CIE (1849–1916) Director of the Irrawaddy Flotilla Company and involved in the Third Anglo-Burmese War (N)
 Helen Kerr LLD (1859–1940) social reformer
 Robert Kilpatrick, Baron Kilpatrick of Kincraig (1926–2015)
 Baron Kinnear (1833–1917)
 Charles Kinnear, architect (1830–1894) of the firm Peddie & Kinnear creators of Cockburn Street, Edinburgh etc. (N)
 All four Baron Kinross spanning almost two centuries (LR)
 John Watson Laidlay FRSE (1808–1885) coin collector and orientalist
 William Law (Lord Provost) (1799–1878) Lord Provost of Edinburgh from 1869–72
 Right Hon Robert Lee, Lord Lee FRSE (1830–1890), Senator of the College of Justice (N)
 Rev Cameron Lees (1835–1913)
 James Leslie (engineer) FRSE (1801–1889) and his son Alexander Leslie (engineer)
 John Lessels (1808–1883) City architect (N)
 David Lind (1797–1856), builder of the Scott Monument
 Dr William Lauder Lindsay FRSE FLS (1829–1880) physician and botanist
 Prof Sir Henry Duncan Littlejohn (1826–1914) public health promoter, forensic science pioneer, plus his son, Henry Harvey Littlejohn (1862–1927) forensic scientist, Edinburgh's first Police Surgeon.
 John Gordon Lorimer (civil servant) (1870–1916) cenotaph
 George MacRitchie Low FRSE FFA (1849–1922), President of the Faculty of Actuaries (N)
 Flora Macaulay (1859–1958) newspaper editor (N)
 Charles McBride (1851–1903) sculptor (bronze head by Henry Snell Gamley) (N)
 John MacGregor McCandlish WS FRSE (1821–1901) first President of the Faculty of Actuaries
 Dr John McCosh (1801–1881) early photographer (cenotaph) (N)
 Sir Hector MacDonald, (d. 1903), Major General, "The Fighting Mac" (bronze by William Birnie Rhind) (N)
 Rev Prof Patrick Campbell MacDougall (1806–1867) Professor of Moral Philosophy
 John McEwan (1832–1875) part of the brewing family
 Very Rev Alexander Robertson MacEwen (1851–1916)
 Donald Macfadyen, Lord Macfadyen (1945–2008) Senator of the College of Justice
 Dr John Lisle Hall MacFarlane (1851–1874), physician and Scotland rugby international (medallion by Sir John Steell)
 David MacGibbon (1831–1902) architect and architectural historian, partner in MacGibbon and Ross (N)
 Archibald Donald Mackenzie, (1914–1944), 'Captain Mack', officer of the Cameron Highlanders and later of the Brigata Stella Rossa, commemorated annually on Liberation Day (Italy) 
 Thomas Mackenzie, Lord Mackenzie (1807–1869) Senator of the College of Justice
 Very Rev Dugald Mackichan (1851–1932)
 Andrew Douglas Maclagan FRSE (1817–1900), physician and toxicologist, and his son Robert Craig Maclagan
 David Maclagan FRSE (1785–1865) military surgeon, surgeon to Queen Victoria in Scotland
 Very Rev Norman Macleod DD (1838–1911) Moderator of the General Assembly of the Church of Scotland in 1900 (N)
 Donald Mackenzie (1818–1875), Scottish judge, styled Lord Mackenzie
 Rev Hugh MacMillan FRSE (1833–1903) (N)
 Sir Daniel Macnee RSA (1806–1882) artist and President of the Royal Scottish Academy (N)
 Rev Dr James Calder Macphail DD (1821–1908) Free Church minister and pioneer photographer (N)
 Robert McVitie (1854–1910) biscuit maker, creator of the digestive biscuit (N) (cenotaph)
 James Maidment (1793–1879) antiquarian (N)
 David Duncan Main (1856–1934) medical missionary
 Edward Maitland, Lord Barcaple (1803–1870)
 Dr Robert Bowes Malcolm FRSE (1807–1894) British obstetrician
 Henry Marshall FRSE (1775–1851) physician and medical statistician
 Very Rev Theodore Marshall DD (1846–1939), Moderator of the General Assembly of the Church of Scotland 1908 (N)
 Robert Matheson (architect) (1808–1877)
 John Miller (1805–1883) half of the partnership Grainger & Miller, railway and dock engineers
 Very Rev John Harry Miller (1869–1940) (N)
 Very Rev James Mitchell DD (1830–1911) Moderator of the General Assembly of the Church of Scotland in 1901
 Rev John Murray Mitchell (1815–1904) missionary and orientalist (N)
 Very Rev Reginald Mitchell-Innes (1848–1930)
 Sir Mitchell Mitchell-Thomson, 1st Baronet (1816–1918) Lord Provost of Edinburgh 1897–1900
 Alexander Monro (tertius) (1773–1859) physician of the Monro dynasty (LR)
 James Francis Montgomery (1818–1897) first Dean of St Marys Episcopal Cathedral
 Dr Charles Morehead (1807–1882)
 William Ambrose Morehead (1805–1863) governor of Madras
 Thomas Corsan Morton (1859–1928) artist
 Rev Dr William Muir (1787–1869) Scottish divine and theological author. Moderator of the General Assembly of the Church of Scotland in 1838 (bronze head by Sir John Steell)
 James Muirhead (1830–1889) Professor of Civil Law at Edinburgh University
 David Mure, Lord Mure (1810–1891) law lord
 Sir John Murray (oceanographer) KCB (d. 1914) leader of the Challenger Expedition (N)
 Robert Milne Murray (1855–1904) gynaecologist
 James Nasmyth (1808–1890), inventor of the steam hammer, monument by John Rhind (N)
 Robert Nasmyth FRSE (1792–1870) dentist to Queen Victoria
 Dr Thomas Goodall Nasmyth FRSE (1855–1937) Medical Officer of Health to Fife, medical author (N)
 Patrick Newbigging FRSE PRSSA (1813–1864)
 Rev Dr Robert Nisbet (1814–1874) 
 Wilfrid Normand, Baron Normand (1884–1962) (N)
 Brownlow North (evangelist) (1810–1875)
 Very Rev James Nicoll Ogilvie DD (1860–1928) Moderator of the General Assembly of the Church of Scotland in 1918.
 Emily Murray Paterson RSW (1855–1934), artist
 James Paterson RSA (1854–1932) artist
 Sir James Balfour Paul (1846–1931) (N)
 Charles Pearson, Lord Pearson (1843–1910) law lord
 John More Dick Peddie (1853–1921) architect (N)
 Samuel Peploe (1871–1935) artist
 Arthur Perigal RSA (1784–1847) artist
 Alexander Mactier Pirrie (1882–1907) anthropologist (N)
 William Henry Playfair (1790–1857), architect
 Major General John Pringle (1774–1861)
 Olive Rae (1878–1933), operatic soprano 
 Rev Robert Rainy (1820–1906) and his son Adam Rolland Rainy MP
 Prof Sir John Rankine (1846–1922) professor of Scots Law and legal author (N)
 Robert Reid (architect) (1774–1856) architect of much of the New Town
 Robert Carstairs Reid (1845–1894) civil engineer
 John Riddell (genealogist) (1785–1862)
 Very Rev Dr George Ritchie (1808–1888) Moderator of the General Assembly of the Church of Scotland in 1870
 John Ritchie (1778–1870) and John Ritchie Findlay (1824–1898) newspaper tycoons
 Dr Robert Peel Ritchie FRSE (1835–1902) medical historian
 Joseph Robertson (1810–1866), antiquarian
 Alexander Ignatius Roche (1861–1921) artist
 Prof Henry Darwin Rogers (1808–1866) US-born geologist
 A huge red granite obelisk to Alexander Russel, editor of The Scotsman (1814–1870) (N)
 Alexander James Russell FRSE CS (1814–1887) lawyer
 Sir James Russell (1846–1918) Lord Provost of Edinburgh 1891–94
 Very Rev James Curdie Russell DD VD (1830–1925) Moderator of the General Assembly of the Church of Scotland 1902 (N)
 Prof William Russell (physician) (1852–1940) discoverer of Russell bodies
 Andrew Rutherfurd, Lord Rutherfurd (1791–1852), designed by the adjacent Playfair
 Prof William Rutherford Sanders FRSE (1828–1881) pathologist
 Very Rev Dr Arcibald Scott DD (1837–1909) Moderator of the Church of Scotland in 1896
 David Scott (painter) (1807–1849)
 Andrew Edward Scougal FRSE LLD (1846–1916) chief inspector of schools
 William Seller FRSE (1798–1869) physician and botanist
 Patrick Shaw (legal writer) (1796–1872)
 Charles Shore, 2nd Baron Teignmouth (1796–1885) politician
 Brigadier General Offley Shore (1863–1922)
 Sir Henry John Forbes Simson (1872–1932) the obstetrician who delivered Queen Elizabeth II and Princess Margaret (N)
 John Sinclair, 1st Baron Pentland (1860–1925)
 Basil Skinner (1923–1995) historian and campaigner for architectural conservation
 Robert T. Skinner FRSE (1867–1946) historian and teacher
 Prof George Gregory Smith (1865–1932)
 Dr John Smith (1800–1879) President of the Royal College of Physicians of Edinburgh
 Robert MacKay Smith FRSE (1802–1888) meteorologist and philanthropist
 Dr John W. L. Spence (1870–1930) x-ray pioneer and martyr to radiology
 Sir James Steel (1830–1904) Lord Provost of Edinburgh (bust by John Stevenson Rhind) (N)
 David Stevenson (1815–1886), his son Charles Alexander Stevenson (1855–1950) (N) and grandson D. Alan Stevenson (1891–1971) (N), lighthouse engineers
 Flora Stevenson (1839–1905) social reformer 
Louisa Stevenson (1835–1908) women's university education, women's suffrage
 James Stevenson (merchant) FRSE (1786–1866) Paisley cotton manufacturer
 John James Stevenson (1831–1908) architect, son of above
 Rev Robert Horne Stevenson DD (1812–1816)
 John Stewart of Nateby Hall FRSE (1813–1867) naturalist
 Prof Sir Thomas Grainger Stewart (1837–1900) and his daughter Agnes Grainger Stewart
 William Stewart, Lord Allanbridge (1925–2012)
 James Stirling (1800–1876) railway engineer and his wife, the author Susan Stirling
 William James Stuart (1873–1958) President of the Royal College of Surgeons of Edinburgh 1937 to 1939 (N)
 Gabriel Surenne FSA (1777–1858) historian
 Lt Gen Thomas Robert Swinburne British army officer and artist
 George Swinton (botanist) FRSE (1780–1854) Chief Secretary of the Government in India
 Major General Sir John Munro Sym (1839–1919)
 Francis Darby Syme (1818–1871) trader in China involved in the coolie riots of 1852 
 John Tait (1787–1856) architect
 The Very Rev C W G Taylor CBE DD (d. 1950) Moderator of the General Assembly of the Church of Scotland 1942
 Robert Tennent FRSE (1813–1890), pioneer photographer and his younger brother Hugh Lyon Tennent (1817–1874) (N)
 D'Arcy Wentworth Thompson (1860–1947) biologist
 Prof Allen Thomson FRS FRSE (1809–1884)
 Rev Dr Andrew Thomson DD (1814–1901) minister and religious author (N)
 Lt Col Frank Wyville Thomson FRSE (1860–1918) public health expert in India
 Sir Frederick Thomson, 1st Baronet MP (1875–1935) and Sir Douglas Thomson, 2nd Baronet MP (1905–1972) politician father and son
 Henry Alexis Thomson (1863–1924) Professor of Surgery
 Robert William Thomson (1822–1873) engineer and inventor of the pneumatic tyre
 Thomas Thomson (advocate) (1768–1852)
 Prof William Thomson (1802–1852), medical author, professor of medicine at the University of Glasgow
 Sir William Turner (anatomist) (1852–1916) and his son Arthur Logan Turner (1865–1939) (N)
 Dr Charles Edward Underhill FRSE (1856–1917) surgeon
 William Veitch LLD (1794–1885) classical scholar
 Major General James Conway Victor (1792–1864) military engineer
 John Waddell (1828–1888) railway engineer
 Sir Norman Walker (1862–1942), dermatologist
 Edward Arthur Walton (1860–1922) artist
 Thomas Drummond Wanliss (1830–1923) Australian politician
 Sir Patrick Heron Watson (1831–1907) Crimean War surgeon, Surgeon to the King (Scotland), first President of the Edinburgh Dental Hospital

 William Watson, Baron Watson (1827–1899) law lord
 Joseph Laing Waugh (1868–1928) author (medallion by William Birnie Rhind)
 Rev Dr Alexander Whyte (1836–1921) (N)
 Sir David Wilkie (1882–1938) surgeon and philanthropist
 Sir Henry Wellwood-Moncreiff, 10th Baronet (1809–1883)
 Aeneas Francon Williams (1886–1971) Church of Scotland Minister, Missionary, Chaplain, Writer and Poet, and his wife Clara Anne Rendall, missionary, teacher and artist.
 Rev Andrew Wallace Williamson (1856–1926)
 John Wilson (1800–1849) Scottish vocalist 
 Prof John Wilson (1785–1854) author under the name of "Christopher North" and his brother James Wilson (1795–1856) a zoologist
 Dr Jenny Wormald (1942–2015) historian

Southern Terrace

 Alexander Hugh Freeland Barbour (1856–1927) pioneer of gynaecology
 Sir George Andreas Berry MP (1853–1940) eye surgeon
 Benjamin Hall Blyth (1849–1917) civil engineer
 Alexander Crum Brown (1838–1922) chemist
 Memorial to George Brown (Canadian politician) (1819–1880) plus the grave of Anne Nelson, his wife (1823–1906)
 Thomas Graham Brown (1882–1965) mountaineer and physiologist
 Duncan Cameron, (1825–1901), owner of The Oban Times newspaper and inventor of The "Waverley" nib pen and his daughter, Mary Cameron (painter) (1865–1921)
 Robert Carfrae FSAScot (1820–1900) antiquarian
 Thomas Clouston (1840–1915) psychiatrist
 Francis Brodie Imlach (1819–1891) pioneer of dentistry and anaesthesia
 Rev Dr Robert Reid Kalley (1809–1888) missionary
 Dr Peter McBride FRSE (1854–1946) physician
 William Mackintosh, Lord Kyllachy FRSE (1842–1918) Senator of the College of Justice
 Rev Angus Makellar (d. 1859) Moderator of the Church of Scotland for 1840
 Sir William Muir (1819–1905) Scottish Orientalist
 Samuel Alexander Pagan (1793–1867) President of the Royal College of Physicians of Edinburgh 1846 to 1848
 Joseph Noel Paton (1821–1901) artist
 Victor Noel-Paton, Baron Ferrier (1900–1992)
 Sir John Skelton (1831–1897) and his wife Dame Jane Adair Skelton (1847–1925)
 Sir David Wallace (1862–1952) urologist
 Dr Alexander Wood (1817–1884) inventor of the hypodermic syringe

20th century extension

 Andrew Anderson, Lord Anderson (1862–1936) Senator of the College of Justice
 John George Bartholomew map-maker (cenotaph)
 Walter Lorrain Brodie (1884–1918), Victoria Cross recipient (cenotaph)
 Andrew Constable, Lord Constable (1865–1928)
 William Skeoch Cumming (1864–1929) artist
 Arthur Dewar, Lord Dewar (1860–1917)
 Charles Scott Dickson, Lord Dickson (1850–1922)
 Sir John Ritchie Findlay, 1st Baronet (1866–1930) newspaper magnate
 Sir Alexander MacPherson Fletcher (1929–1989) MP 1973 to 1987
 John Alexander Ford (1864–1925) artist
 Very Rev James Rae Forgan (1876–1966) Moderator of the General Assembly of the Church of Scotland 1940
 Margaret Neill Fraser (1880–1915) lady golfer and heroine of the First World War memorialised on grave of Patrick Neill Fraser FRSE (buried in Serbia where she died)
 John George Govan (1861–1927) founder of the Faith Mission
 Herbert John Clifford Grierson (1866–1960)
 Rev Andrew Harper DD (1844–1936)
 John Robertson Henderson FRSE (1863–1925) zoologist
 Lady Caroline and Lord Walter James Hore, Baron Ruthven of Gowrie (1838–1921)
 George Hutchison (Unionist MP) (1873–1928)
 John Alexander Inglis (1873–1941) historian and author
 Ernest Auldjo Jamieson (1880–1937) architect
 George Auldjo Jamieson (1827–1900) accountant and company director
 David Smiles Jerdan FRSE (1871–1951) businessman and horticulturalist
 Christopher Nicholson Johnston, Lord Sands (1857–1934) law lord and politician
 Stewart Kaye (1886–1952) architect
 Joseph Fairweather Lamb FRSE (1928–2015) physiologist
 Sir George Macdonald (1862–1940) archaeologist
 Sir Alexander MacPherson Fletcher MP (1929–1989)
 Father John Maitland Moir (1924–2013) priest 
 Alexander Munro MacRobert (1873–1930) MP and Lord Advocate
 Sir Walter Mercer (1890–1971) surgeon
 George F. Merson FRSE (1866–1959) pharmacist
 Thomas Brash Morison (1868–1945) Senator of the College of Justice
 Sir Robert Muir FRS (1864–1959) pathologist, and his sister, Anne Davidson Muir RSW (1875–1951) artist
 Joseph Shield Nicholson (1850–1927) economist
 Ella Pirrie (1857–1929) friend and colleague of Florence Nightingale, first head nurse of Belfast City Hospital and first superintendent of the Deaconess Hospital in Edinburgh
 Edward Theodore Salvesen, Lord Salvesen (1857–1942) (bronze by Henry Snell Gamley) including the grave of his father-in-law, John Trayner, Lord Trayner
 Sir David William Scott-Barrett (1922–2003)
 Alistair Smart (1922–1992) art historian
 Sydney Goodsir Smith (1915–1975) poet and artist
 Lewis Spence (1874–1955) journalist, author and poet
 Douglas Strachan HRSA (1875–1950) stained glass window designer
 Sir Henry Wade (1876–1955) surgeon
 Sir Thomas Barnby Whitson (1869–1948) Lord Provost of Edinburgh 1929 to 1932

Other monuments of interest

 Monument to John George Bartholomew, map-maker (buried in Portugal) on the north wall of the 20th century cemetery extension (sculpted by Pilkington Jackson)
 Monument to Robert Dunsmure and his brothers, all of whom died abroad
 Monument to Col Lauderdale Maule and the 79th Cameron Highlanders marking their role in the Crimean War at Alma and Sevastopol. The rear of the monument commemorates their part in the Indian Mutiny at Lucknow
 Monument to the Edinburgh-born Confederate Colonel Robert A. Smith who died in 1862 at Munfordsville, Kentucky in the American Civil War
 Monument to historian John Hill Burton, who is buried at Dalmeny. Monument in Dean is by William Brodie
 Monument to John Wilson (1800–1849), vocalist (buried in Quebec), also subject of a memorial at the foot of Calton Hill
 The Cemetery contains the war graves of 39 Commonwealth service personnel, 29 from World War I and 10 from World War II, registered and maintained by the Commonwealth War Graves Commission. The oldest soldier buried is Major-General Sir John Munro Sym KCB (1839–1919) aged 80 (this is a normal grave not a CWGC grave). Most of the war graves lie in the independently accessed 20th century section to the north of the main cemetery.
 Robert Digby-Jones VC is memorialised on his parents' grave in the north extension.
 Monument to the orphans dying at the immediately adjacent Dean Orphanage

References

Bibliography
 The Dean Cemetery, Edinburgh edited by A. S. Cowper and Euan S. McIver, Edinburgh, 1992. .

External links
 Official website
 

 
Cemeteries in Edinburgh
Inventory of Gardens and Designed Landscapes
Category A listed buildings in Edinburgh
Tourist attractions in Edinburgh
Commonwealth War Graves Commission cemeteries in Scotland
1846 establishments in Scotland